Bank of Jilin (in ) is a commercial bank approved by China Banking Regulatory Commission , with its headquarters in Changchun, Jilin Province, China. As of the end of 2010, Bank of Jilin assets stood at 147.8 billion yuan (USD 23.75 billion), up 87% since the establishment, deposits reached 117.4 billion yuan (USD 18.86 billion), an increase by 61% compared to establishment; loan balance of 79 billion yuan (USD 12.69 billion), an increase to 148% since establishment. Net profit of more than three years accounted for nearly 28 billion yuan (USD 4.5 billion) and profitability of the firm has been among the highest in the province.

History 

Bank of Jilin was originally established as Changchun City Commercial Bank in 1997, and later changed its name to Bank of Jilin in October 2007 upon merger with Jilin and Liaoyuan City Commercial Banks. In 2008, it further absorbed Tonghua, Siping, Baishan and Songyuan Commercial Banks, and opened a new branch in Yanbian.

In December 2009, Dalian Branch was established marking the bank as an inter-regional Joint Stock Commercial Bank. Subsequently, Shenyang, Tianjin, Shanghai and Beijing branches were also established.

Logo 

The logo in symbolic form, to Bank of Jilin English initials "J" for the creative elements, different from the traditional banking system with money as the main characteristics of the logo. Theme graphics and half-moon circle composed of "j", meaning the sun and moon, representing the Bank of Jilin will serve China 's economic construction as the starting point, strive to improve their market competitiveness, and ultimately develop together with the country's economic construction. Graphics also as "comma" Punctuation, metaphor Bank of Jilin perseverance, never stop, and grew, and constantly improve themselves enterprising spirit. Line labeled standard color is red, a symbol of vitality, development, dynamic, meaning Bank of Jilin flourish.

Products and Services 

Bank of Jilin provides a wide range of retail banking options for Deposits, Loans, Internet & mobile banking, micro-financing etc. Besides these, the other services provided include International trade financing, import/export bills, shipping guarantees, foreign currency exchange, remittance options like western union, swift etc., treasury operations and inter-bank deposits.

The bank also provides entrusted loan services to government enterprises and large corporate entities (Non-banking financial company). Currently as per PBOC  regulations, only authorized financial companies and banks are allowed to lend money. Using the entrusted loan services provided by the bank, these NBFC's can indirectly lend money to their customers.

See also
 Changchun
 Jilin
 Banking in China
 Commercial banks in Northeast China
Dalian Bank, Shengjing Bank (Shenyang), Bank of Jilin, Harbin Bank, etc.

References

External links
 Bank of Jilin's official site   (in Chinese)

Banks of China
Companies based in Changchun